The Canadian Ambassador to the United Arab Emirates is an official diplomatic post held by a senior Canadian civil servant.

List of Canadian ambassadors to the United Arab Emirates

See also 
Canada–United Arab Emirates relations
Embassy of Canada, Abu Dhabi

Notes 

United Arab Emirates
 
Canada